Jalen Markey (born March 30, 1995) is an American soccer player.

Career

College and Amateur
Markey committed to play college soccer at the University of North Carolina at Chapel Hill, but was injured for his entire first season. Markey transferred to Oregon State University, where he played from 2013 to 2017.

While at college, Markey played with USL PDL side Washington Crossfire.

Professional
On September 6, 2018, Markey signed his first professional contract, joining USL club Seattle Sounders FC 2.

References

External links

Jalen Markey at Seattle Sounders FC 2
Jalen Markey at UNC Chapel Hill
Jalen Markey at Oregon State
Jalen Markey at United States U18

1995 births
Living people
American soccer players
North Carolina Tar Heels men's soccer players
Oregon State Beavers men's soccer players
Washington Crossfire players
Tacoma Defiance players
Miami FC players
Association football defenders
Soccer players from Washington (state)
USL League Two players
USL Championship players
National Independent Soccer Association players